Mumford is a 1999 American comedy-drama film written and directed by Lawrence Kasdan. It is set in a small town where a new psychologist (Loren Dean) gives offbeat advice to the neurotic residents. Both the psychologist and the town are named Mumford, a coincidence that eventually figures in the plot. The film co-stars Hope Davis, Jason Lee, Alfre Woodard, Mary McDonnell, Martin Short, David Paymer, Pruitt Taylor Vince, Ted Danson, and Zooey Deschanel in her film debut.

Plot
As a relative newcomer to an Oregon town that bears his name, Dr. Mumford (Loren Dean) seems charming and skillful to his neighbors and patients. His unique, frank approach to psychotherapy soon attracts patients away from the two therapists (David Paymer and Jane Adams) already working in the area.

Soon he is treating a variety of conditions, ranging from the obsession of one man (Pruitt Taylor Vince) with erotic novels to an unhappily married woman (Mary McDonnell) and her compulsive shopping. Mumford befriends a billionaire computer mogul (Jason Lee) and a cafe waitress (Alfre Woodard) and attempts to play matchmaker. He also begins to fall for a patient (Hope Davis) who suffers from chronic fatigue syndrome.

Together with an attorney (Martin Short) whom Mumford had rejected as a patient because of his narcissism, the rival therapists conspire to find skeletons in Mumford's closet, hoping to destroy his reputation. Meanwhile, Mumford's inherent likability causes his life to become intertwined with much of the rest of the town.

Cast
 Loren Dean as Dr. Mumford
 Hope Davis as Sofie Crisp
 Jason Lee as Skip Skipperton
 Alfre Woodard as Lily
 Mary McDonnell as Althea Brockett
 Pruitt Taylor Vince as Henry Follett
 Zooey Deschanel as Nessa Watkins
 Martin Short as Lionel Dillard
 David Paymer as Dr. Ernest Delbanco
 Jane Adams as Dr. Phyllis Sheeler
 Kevin Tighe and Dana Ivey as Mr. and Mrs. Crisp
 Ted Danson as Jeremy Brockett
 Jason Ritter as Martin Brockett
 Elisabeth Moss as Katie Brockett
 Robert Stack as himself
 Simon Helberg as College Roommate

The film also includes future Dancing with the Stars contestant and winner Kelly Monaco in a small nonspeaking role.

Reception
Mumford was met with mixed reviews. Many critics expressed a general approval, but questioned the unpleasant back story (which contrasted with the overall tone of the film). The film has a 57% rating on Rotten Tomatoes, based on 81 reviews, with an average rating of 5.92/10. The website's critical consensus states: "Memorable moments are few and far between." On Metacritic, the film has a weighted average score of 62 out of 100, based on 33 critics, indicating "generally favorable reviews".

Roger Ebert gave a favorable review: "There are no earth-shaking payoffs here. No dramatic astonishments, vile betrayals or sexual surprises. Just the careful and loving creation of some characters it is mostly a pleasure to meet. And at its deepest level, profoundly down there below the surface, it is something more, I think: an expression of Kasdan's humanist longings, his wish that people would listen better and value one another more. It is the strangest thing, how this movie sneaks up and makes you feel a little better about yourself."

The film, based on a $28 million budget, was a commercial failure, earning only $4,555,459 in the US.

References

External links

 
 
 
 

1999 films
1999 romantic comedy-drama films
American romantic comedy-drama films
American screwball comedy films
1990s English-language films
Films set in Oregon
Films shot in California
Films about psychiatry
Films directed by Lawrence Kasdan
Touchstone Pictures films
Films scored by James Newton Howard
1999 comedy films
1990s American films